Tuni Mandal is one of the 21 mandals in Kakinada District of Andhra Pradesh. As per census 2011, there are 1 town and 20 villages.

Demographics 
Tuni Mandal has total population of 138,079 as per the Census 2011 out of which 67,734 are males while 70,345 are females and the Average Sex Ratio of Tuni Mandal is 1,039. The total literacy rate of Tuni Mandal is 64.64%. The male literacy rate is 61.72% and the female literacy rate is 53.62%.

Towns & Villages

Towns 

 Tuni (Municipality)

Villages 

 Atikivaripalem
 Ch. Agraharam
 Chamavaram
 Chepuru
 D. Polavaram
 Dondavaka
 Hamsavaram
 K.O. Mallavaram
 Kavalapadu
 Kolimeru
 V.Kothuru
 Maruvada
 N. Suravaram
 Nandivampu
 Rapaka
 Rekhavanipalem
 S. Annavaram
 Talluru
 Tetagunta
 Valluru a agraharam

See also 
List of mandals in Andhra Pradesh

References 

Mandals in Kakinada district
Mandals in Andhra Pradesh